Ukraine competed at the Youth Olympic Games for the first time in 2010 in Singapore, and has participated in every Games since then.

The National Olympic Committee for Ukraine is the National Olympic Committee of Ukraine, which was created in 1990 and recognized in 1993.

Ukrainian athletes have won 74 medals at the Summer Youth Games, and 2 at the Winter Youth Games.

Medal tables

Medals by Summer Games

Medals by Winter Games

Medals by summer sport

Medals by winter sport

List of medalists

 2010 Summer Youth Olympics - Singapore

 2012 Winter Youth Olympics - Innsbruck

 2014 Summer Youth Olympics - Nanjing

 2016 Winter Youth Olympics - Lillehammer

 2018 Summer Youth Olympics - Buenos Aires

 2020 Winter Youth Olympics - Lausanne

See also
Ukraine at the Olympics
Ukraine at the Paralympics

References

 
Nations at the Youth Olympic Games